Louis A. Bloom (August 15, 1900 – December 18, 1988) was an American politician from Pennsylvania who served as a Republican member of the Pennsylvania House of Representatives for Delaware County from 1947 to 1952.  He was a judge in the Pennsylvania Court of Common Pleas for Delaware County.

Early life and education 
Bloom was born in Russia and graduated from Chester High School in Chester, Pennsylvania in 1918.  He graduated from the Wharton School at the University of Pennsylvania in 1922 and the University of Pennsylvania Law School in 1925.

Career
Bloom worked as an attorney-at-law and as Assistant District Attorney for Delaware County for 16 years.  He was elected to the Pennsylvania House of Representatives for Delaware County and served from 1947 to 1952.  He was not a candidate for reelection for the 1953 term.

Bloom was elected treasurer and solicitor for Chester, Pennsylvania.  He was elected judge for the Pennsylvania Court of Common Pleas for Delaware County in 1965.

Bloom served as president of the advisory board for the Pennsylvania State University Delaware County campus from 1968 to 1987.

Bloom died in Lansdowne, Pennsylvania and is interred at the Ohev Shalom Cemetery in Brookhaven, Pennsylvania.

Legacy
The Judge Louis A. Bloom Scholarship was established at the Pennsylvania State University Brandywine Campus in honor of Bloom.

Personal life
Bloom was married to Gertrude Landow Bloom. He was a member of Chester Post #134 of the Jewish War Veterans of the United States.

References

1900 births
1988 deaths
20th-century American Jews
20th-century American judges
20th-century American lawyers
20th-century American politicians
Burials in Pennsylvania
Chester High School alumni
County district attorneys in Pennsylvania
Jewish American state legislators in Pennsylvania
Judges of the Pennsylvania Courts of Common Pleas
Republican Party members of the Pennsylvania House of Representatives
Pennsylvania lawyers
People from Chester, Pennsylvania
University of Pennsylvania Law School alumni